"I Shyne" (stylized as "i SHYNE") is a song recorded by Guatemalan-American DJ Carnage and American rapper Lil Pump. It was released on January 18, 2018 by Heavyweight Records as the second single from Carnage's second studio album Battered, Bruised & Bloody. The song was produced by Carnage, who has notably shifted in focus from EDM production to trap-influenced beats in recent years.

Background
On January 18, 2018, Carnage announced the song and its release date. In an interview with XXL Mag, he stated that while working with Lil Pump, the song came together almost effortlessly. He stated, "I made the beat in about five minutes and immediately sent it to Lil Pump. He laced the track in less than 48 hours and the rest was history." The title is influenced by the episode names of iCarly, and the design is influenced by the title of the show.

Critical reception
Billboards Kat Bein said Lil Pump "is a savage all over the beat. He really has some kind of superhuman ability to shout forever," while HotNewHipHop's Aron A stated, "It's a perfect match of a producer who creates nothing but high energy pieces of work and a young rapper that carries the same energy on his day to day life."

Charts

References

2018 songs
2018 singles
Lil Pump songs
Songs written by Lil Pump
Trap music songs